The 1991 BMW Open was a men's tennis tournament held in Munich, Germany and played on outdoor clay courts. The event was part of the ATP World Series category of the Association of Tennis Professionals tour. It was the 75th edition of the tournament and was held from 29 April through 6 May 1991. Unseeded Magnus Gustafsson won the singles title.

Finals

Singles

 Magnus Gustafsson defeated  Guillermo Pérez Roldán 3–6, 6–3, 4–3 (Perez-Roldan retired)
 It was Gustafsson's 1st title of the year and the 1st of his career.

Doubles

 Patrick Galbraith /  Todd Witsken defeated  Anders Järryd /  Danie Visser 7–5, 6–4
 It was Galbraith's 3rd title of the year and the 6th of his career. It was Witsken's 2nd title of the year and the 10th of his career.

References

External links 
 ATP – Tournament profile
 ITF – Tournament details

 
BMW Open
Bavarian International Tennis Championships
BMW Open
BMW Open
BMW Open